Sigurd Mathiesene (30 August 1873 – 4 January 1951) was a Norwegian fencer. He competed in the individual épée event at the 1912 Summer Olympics.

References

External links
 

1873 births
1951 deaths
Norwegian male épée fencers
Olympic fencers of Norway
Fencers at the 1912 Summer Olympics
People from Horten
Sportspeople from Vestfold og Telemark
20th-century Norwegian people